Lay's is a brand of potato chips with different flavors, as well as the name of the company that founded the chip brand in the United States. The brand is also referred to as Frito-Lay because both Lay's and Fritos are brands sold by the Frito-Lay company, which has been a wholly owned subsidiary of PepsiCo since 1965.

Frito-Lay primarily uses the brand name "Lay's" in the United States, and uses other brand names in certain other countries: Walkers in the UK and Ireland; Smith's in Australia; Chipsy in Egypt and the West Balkans; Tapuchips in Israel; Margarita in Colombia; Sabritas in Mexico.

History 
In 1932, salesman Herman Lay opened a snack food operation in Nashville, Tennessee. In 1938, he purchased the Atlanta, Georgia-based potato chip manufacturer "Barrett Food Company", renaming it "H.W. Lay Lingo & Company". Lay crisscrossed the southern United States, selling the product from the trunk of his car.

The business shortened its name to "the Lay's Lay Lingo Company" in 1944 and became the first snack food manufacturer to purchase television commercials, using Bert Lahr as its celebrity spokesperson.

In 1961, the Frito Company, founded by Charles E. Doolin, merged with Lay’s, forming Frito-Lay Inc., a snack food giant with combined sales of over $127 million annually, which was then the highest sales revenue earned by any manufacturer. Shortly thereafter, Lay's introduced what became its best-known slogan: "betcha can't eat just one". Sales of the chips became international, with marketing assisted by a number of celebrity endorsers. Annual revenues for Frito-Lay exceeded $180 million by 1965, when the company had more than 8,000 employees and 46 manufacturing plants. 

In 1965, Frito-Lay merged with the Pepsi-Cola Company to form PepsiCo, Inc. In 1991, the company introduced a new formulation of their chip that was crisper and kept fresher longer. Shortly thereafter, the company introduced the "Wavy Lay's" products to grocery shelves, with a national rollout in 1994. In the mid- to late 1990s, Lay's introduced a lower-calorie baked variety, and a fat-free variety (Lay's WOW chips) that contained the fat substitute olestra.

In the 2000s, the company introduced “kettle-cooked” varieties, as well as a more highly processed variety (Lay's Stax) that was intended to compete with Pringles, and several differently flavored varieties.

In 2012, Frito-Lay products comprised 59% of the United States savory snack-food market.

International

Flavors

Nutritional information
As with most snack foods, the Lay's brands contain very few vitamins and minerals in any variety. At ten percent of the daily requirement per serving, vitamin C is the highest. Salt content is particularly high, with a serving containing as much as 380 mg of sodium.

A one-ounce (28 gram) serving of Lay's regular potato chips has 160 Calories, and contains ten grams of fat, with one gram of saturated fat. Kettle-cooked brands have seven to eight grams of fat and one gram of saturated fat, and are 140 Calories. Lay's Natural has nine grams of fat, two grams of saturated fat and 150 Calories. Stax chips typically contain ten grams of fat, 2.5 grams saturated fat and are 160 calories per serving. Wavy Lay's are identical to the regular brand, except for a half-gram less of saturated fat in some combinations. Now the various brands do not contain any trans fats.

A 50 gram serving of Lay's BarBQ chips contains 270 calories, and 17 grams of fat. It also contains 270 mg of sodium, and 15% of the daily recommended dose of Vitamin C.

The baked variety, introduced in the mid 1990s, feature 1.5 grams of fat per one ounce serving, and have no saturated fat. Each serving has 110 to 120 Calories. Lay's Light servings are 75 Calories per ounce and have no fat.

Lay's Classic Potato chips were cooked in hydrogenated oil until 2003. Currently, the chips are made with sunflower, corn and/or canola oil.

Controversy 
In April 2019, PepsiCo's Indian subsidiary sued four farmers in Gujarat, India for copyright infringement, claiming they were growing a variety of potatoes trademarked by the company for exclusive use in its Lay's potato chips. Two years later, the ruling was done in the farmers' favour under the Protection of Plant Varieties and Farmers' Rights Act, 2001.

References

External links

 

Brand name snack foods
Frito-Lay brands
Brand name potato chips and crisps
Products introduced in 1932